The following is a list of people executed by the U.S. state of Texas since 2020. To date, 16 people have been executed since 2020. All of the people during this period were convicted of murder and have been executed by lethal injection at the Huntsville Unit in Huntsville, Texas.

Executions 2020–present
The number in the "#" column indicates the nth person executed since 1982 (when Texas resumed the death penalty). As an example, John Steven Gardner (the first person executed in Texas during the 2020 decade) was the 568th person executed since resumption of the death penalty.

Notes

References

External links
Death Row Information. Texas Department of Criminal Justice

2020
Executed
People executed in Texas, 2020–present
21st-century executions by Texas
Executed in Texas, 2020–present